Shandan (also Romanized as Shandān and Shendān; also known as Shandān-e ‘Arab, Shandān-e Gharb, and Shandu) is a village in Pishkuh Rural District, in the Central District of Qaen County, South Khorasan Province, Iran. At the 2006 census, its population was 302, in 76 families.

References 

Populated places in Qaen County